Linnea Gonzales (born August 15, 1997) is an American field hockey player.

Personal life
Gonzales was born in Bel Air, Maryland. She originally played soccer, but began playing hockey after her sister started. One of her role models is former United States international, Katie Bam, who also uses an STX hockey stick.

She is a student at the University of Maryland.

Career

Junior National Team
Gonzales represented the United States Under 21 side at the 2016 Junior World Cup. The team finished in eighth place.

Senior National Team
Gonzales made her senior international debut in 2019 during a test series against Chile in Santiago.

Since her debut, Gonzales has been a regular inclusion in the United States national squad, most recently appearing in the 2019 FIH Pro League.

International goals

References

1997 births
Living people
American female field hockey players
Pan American Games bronze medalists for the United States
Pan American Games medalists in field hockey
Field hockey players at the 2019 Pan American Games
Sportspeople from Maryland
People from Bel Air, Maryland
Medalists at the 2019 Pan American Games
21st-century American women